Zigovka is a rural locality (a selo) in Kostyukovsky Selsoviet of Svobodnensky District, Amur Oblast, Russia. The population was 125 as of 2018. There are 2 streets.

Geography 
Zigovka is located 47 km west of Svobodny (the district's administrative centre) by road. Kostyukovka is the nearest rural locality.

References 

Rural localities in Svobodnensky District